Pseudostixis integra is a species of beetle in the family Cerambycidae. It was described by Stephan von Breuning.

References

Phrissomini